Maliyadeva College (Sinhala: මලියදේව විද්‍යාලය) is a national school controlled by the Sri Lankan central government. It is located in Kurunegala, Sri Lanka, and was established in 1888 by the Buddhist Theosophical Society, led by Colonel Henry Steel Olcott. It is one of Sri Lanka's oldest schools. Today, the school accommodates 5,000 students. The term "Devans" is used to refer to the former and present pupils of Maliyadeva College.

College name
The school is referred to as Maliyadeva College or simply as Maliyadeva. Local newspapers also refer to it as the Maliyadeva Boys' College. The school was named Maliyadeva College after Arhat Maliyadeva, the last Maha Arhat thero in Buddhist history who had great psychic powers (Abhijnanalabhi: in Sinhala:අභිඥ්ඥාලාභී). Although there are several schools, especially in this part of the island, that have adopted the name Maliyadeva, none have links to Maliyadeva College other than the Maliyadeva Balika Vidyalaya, which was separated in 1946 from the previously mixed Maliyadeva College as an institution for girls.

History
In June 1888, a new school with one student was opened at a place in Bodhiraja Mawatha near the present Central Bus Stand in Kurunegala, by Semenaries A. Bamunu-Arachchige. He was a young Maha-Vidane (Vidane Arachchi
) who had been put in charge of four villages by Maha-Mudaliyar Bandaranaike and Colonel Henry Steel Olcott. He was assisted by local donors, Hulugalle,Adikaram and Mudaliyar Attygala. The school was named Kurunegala Buddhist Institution.

By 1908, the number of students had risen to one hundred, still under the leadership of Maha-Vidane Semenaries. In 1909, the school was moved to a new premises at a Buddhist Temple, Ethkanda Viharaya, along the Kandy – Kurunegala main road. This decision was made by the Mudaliyar Bandaranaike and Maha Vidane Semenaries.

In 1922, the school's management was changed from the Buddhist Theosophical Society to the YMBA (Young Men's Buddhist Association). Dr. H.K.T. De Zylva became the new manager.

The school was still governed by B.A Semenaries who, being a Maha-Vidane, had the power to change anything if given permission by the Mudaliyar of the province. In late 1927, Maha-Vidane Semenaries changed the school's name to Maliyadeva College. B.A. Semenaries retired from governing the school in 1931 and, after forty-three years as Maha-Vidane, he gave the position to Bandaranaike's son, the future prime minister of Ceylon. Before leaving, Maha-Vidane Semeneries appointed U.B. Wanninayaka (who later became a politician and government minister) as the principal in 1930 and abolished the manager system. Sir Henry Olcott died in 1907. Maha-Vidane Semenaries died in June 1945.

In 1934, a batch of students from the Maliyadeva College appeared for the SSC Examination (equivalent to current GCE) for the first time.

By 1936, the premises at Ethkanda Viharaya were not big enough. Former governor Maha-Vidane Semenaries and Mudaliyar Bandaranaike, who was on his last term, gave the order for the school to be moved to its current location along the Negombo - Kurunegala road. The land was owned by Madawala Disawa and was bought by H.K.T. De Zylva.

P. De S. Kularatne was appointed as the manager in 1941. He changed the status of the school into a mixed school.

Due to the Second World War, the school buildings and land were taken over by the Army in 1942. The school had to be shifted back to its previous location at Ethkanda Viharaya. By then, the number of students had increased to over three hundred and sixty.

The primary section of the school was moved to a new location along the Colombo – Kurunegala road in 1944. This later became the Maliyadeva Girls' College.

In 1946, the school was handed back to the YMBA by the army. Only the boys were moved back, and the Maliyadeva Girls' College began functioning as a separate school. In the same year, Maliyadeva College became a Government assisted school. The number of students had increased to 800.

In 1949, the school was upgraded to the status of a Grade 1 school. University Entrance (Arts) and SSC (equivalent to current GCE) Science classes began and D.B. Dissanayaka was appointed as the vice-principal during this year.

In 1951, students appeared for the University Entrance (Arts) and SSC (Science) Examinations for the first time. T. B. H. Abeysinghe was the first student to enter the University from Maliyadeva College. Later, Abeysinghe rose to the position of professor of history.

University Entrance (science) classes were commenced in 1953. Wanigasekara was the first graduate science teacher appointed to the school. In 1955, A. P. K. Thilakarathna was the first student who passed the SSC (Science) Examinations for the first time.

According to the Education Policy of the incumbent government, the status of the school changed from government-assisted school to a government school in 1961 during the take over of all assisted schools. The YMBA handed the school over to the Ministry of Education.

Maliyadeva had won the all-island awards in oriental music and orchestra competitions for many years consecutively. 1979 saw an end of an era as D.B. Dissanayake retired after serving the school for fourteen years as the principal. By 1985, the number of students had risen to 3000. The school was upgraded to the status of a National School by the Ministry of Education  under the reorganization of schools.

Religious background

Maliyadeva College is unique in having a Buddhist temple in the school itself. The discipline and ethics of the students are largely directed by the college temple.

The school Buddhist Association was established in 1961. Before that, an association called Buddhist Kathakodhaya Association was commenced with the leadership of Ven. Ibbagala Rajamaha Viharadhipathi Nakaththe Anandha Thera and U. B. Wanninayake. After that, the school became the headquarters of Buddhists in this area. Therefore, Regional Buddhist Association was commenced with the leadership of Maliyadeva College Buddhist Association. The first shrine was built in 1939.

Today, Buddhist Association is the base of ethics and religious activities in school. All students are members of the association. It organizes religious activities throughout the year, such as annual Katina Pinkama(කඨින චීවර පූජාව), annual Parithrana Dharmadeshanawa, annual Sangagatha Dakshinawa, Pirith Pinkam and Buddhist Pageants.

Facilities
Facilities include playgrounds, auditorium, swimming pool, basketball court, Indoor stadium, children's parks, computer labs, medical and dental centers, two-storied shrine for Buddhist monks, gymnasium, library, botanical, zoological, physical and chemical labs, hostel, canteens, co-operative shops, milk bar and transport services.

Crest
The college crest is one of the identities of Maliyadeva College. It is designed with meaningful symbols. Every student wears a uniform with the badge stitched on their pocket, while the prefects wear an additional metal badge resembling the school crest on the center of their chest.

 The shield shape of the college crest emphasizes the power and the courage of the school.
 On a symmetrically twined ribbon of maroon color, the name of the college is carved.
 The tusker in the middle represents Athugalpura, an old name for Kurunegala, the city where the college is located.
 The three lotus flowers symbolize the Triple Gem.
 The seven petals in each flower stand for Sath Koralaya, which is what the area was called during the monarchical era.
 On top of the shield, Vidya Bhushanam Purusha Bhushanam is engraved in Sanskrit. This is the motto of Maliyadeva College, which means Knowledge is the Jewel of the Man.

Houses
The students are divided into four houses according to their admission numbers. The house names are derived from the past kings of Sri Lanka.

  –  Thissa 
In honour of King Devanampiya Thissa.
  –  Gemunu
In honour of King Dutugemunu.
  –  Parakrama
In honour of King Parakramabahu.
  –  Rajasinha
In honour of King Rajasinha.

The four houses compete in the annual inter-house sports meeting which is usually held in the first term of the academic year.

Old Boys' Association
On 13 July 1936, Rev. Nakette Ananda gathered a number of old boys of the school to initiate an Old Boys Association. Under the chairmanship of the principal, U. B. Wanninayake, a decision was made to build a Sanghawasaya (A place for the monks to live) for the school. Ananda was appointed as the patron, and Wanninayake as the association's president. Other officials elected were H. W. Gunasekara as secretary and E. S. Balasuriya as treasurer. Since that date, a president is elected by members at each annual general meeting.

Past principals

Notable alumni

Former students of Maliyadeva College are known as Old Devans.

References

External links

 Maliyadeva College official Facebook page
 Maliyadeva College Advance Level(A/L) Biology and Mathematics Batch of 2015
 School tribute song (done by OBA '98 group)
 A/L best results in Island 2015
 Maliyadeva College Sinhala Wikipedia Page 
 Maliyadeva Scout Group Wikipedia Page

 
1888 establishments in Ceylon
Boys' schools in Sri Lanka
Buddhist schools in Sri Lanka
Educational institutions established in 1888
National schools in Sri Lanka
Schools in Kurunegala